Sebastianus (died 413), a brother of Jovinus, was an aristocrat of southern Gaul. After Jovinus usurped the throne of the western Roman Emperor Honorius in Gaul in 411, he named Sebastianus as Augustus (co-emperor) in 412. Coins bearing Sebastianus' image were then minted at Arles and Trier.

Due to broken relations between Jovinus and King Ataulf of the Visigoths, however, Ataulf captured Sebastianus in 413 and turned him over to Dardanus, Honorius' praetorian governor in Gaul. Dardanus then executed Sebastianus and sent his head to Honorius's court at Ravenna.

External links

De Imperatoribus Romanis: Hugh Elton, "Western Roman Emperors of the First Quarter of the Fifth Century"

5th-century Roman emperors
413 deaths
5th-century Roman usurpers
5th-century murdered monarchs
Year of birth unknown
People executed by the Roman Empire
Executed Roman emperors